The 1944 NFL season was the 25th regular season of the National Football League. The Boston Yanks joined the league as an expansion team. Also, the Triangles-Dodgers franchise changed their name to the Brooklyn Tigers for this one season before merging with the aforementioned Yanks the following year. Meanwhile, both the Cleveland Rams and the Philadelphia Eagles resumed their traditional operations, while the Pittsburgh Steelers merged with the Chicago Cardinals for this one season due to player shortages as a result of World War II. The combined team, known as Card-Pitt, played three home games in Pittsburgh and two in Chicago, and set the 20th century record for lowest punting average by an NFL team with 32.7 yards per punt.

The season is notable in that it featured two winless teams, the only such case in NFL history since 1935 (when the league stabilized from its early years of Revolving door membership, when winless teams were much more common) as both Brooklyn and Card-Pitt finished 0–10. 

Since 1944, only five teams have had winless seasons in the NFL: the 1960 Dallas Cowboys (0–11–1), the 1976 Tampa Bay Buccaneers (0–14), the 1982 Baltimore Colts (0–8–1) the 2008 Detroit Lions (0–16), and the 2017 Cleveland Browns (0–16). In the case of the Colts, the season was shortened due to a league-wide players strike, while the Cowboys and Buccaneers were both expansion teams.

The season ended when the Green Bay Packers defeated the New York Giants in the NFL Championship Game.

Draft
The 1944 NFL Draft was held on April 19, 1944 at Philadelphia's Warwick Hotel. With the first pick, the Boston Yanks selected quarterback Angelo Bertelli from the University of Notre Dame.

Major rule changes
The free substitution rule is modified so that substitutes do not have to report to the officials before a play.
Communication between the players and coaches on the field is permitted as long as the coaches are in the designated areas along the sidelines, and that they do not cause a delay in the game.
If the offensive team commits pass interference in their opponent's end zone, it is just a distance penalty and no longer an automatic touchback.

Division races
Each team played ten games over thirteen weeks. The Brooklyn Tigers lost seven of their games by a touchdown or less. On October 29, they had 14–7 lead over Boston at halftime, before losing 17–14 in Week Seven.  The same week, Card-Pitt's 42–20 loss at Washington eliminated it from playoff contention.  Card-Pitt had actually taken a 28–23 lead over the Rams in its first game, played September 24 at Pittsburgh, before falling 30–28; its only other lead was a 7–0 in a game at Chicago against the Packers, which it eventually lost 35–20.

The Western Division race was no contest, as the Packers won their first six games and stayed ahead of all challengers. In the Eastern Division, Washington (5–0–1) and Philadelphia (4–0–2) were both unbeaten after nine weeks. The teams met in Washington in Week Ten (November 26), and the Eagles won 37–7, putting them at 5–0–2, with the Redskins and Giants a half game back at 5–1–1. The Eagles lost, while the Giants and Redskins won, in Week Eleven, putting New York and Washington in the lead at 6–1–1. In Week Twelve, a crowd of 47,457 turned out at New York's Polo Grounds to watch the Giants and Redksins. Washington had a 13–10 lead before falling 16–13. In Week Thirteen, the Eagles beat the Rams 26–13, giving them a 7–1–2 finish, then waited to see how the 7–1–1 Giants would fare in their rematch at Washington. The Giants beat the Skins 31–0, capturing the division and the right to host the championship.

Final standings

NFL Championship Game
Green Bay 14, N.Y. Giants 7, at Polo Grounds, New York City, December 17, 1944

League leaders

Awards

Coaching changes
Brooklyn Tigers: Pete Cawthon, Ed Kubale, and Frank Bridges served as co-coaches throughout the 1944 season.
Boston Yanks: Herb Kopf became the first head coach of the new team.
Card-Pitt: Chicago Cardinals head coach Phil Handler and Pittsburgh Steelers head coach Walt Kiesling served as co-head coaches of Card-Pitt.
Cleveland Rams: The Rams resumed operations with a new head coach, Aldo Donelli.
Philadelphia Eagles: Greasy Neale returned as sole head coach after the team resumed traditional operations.
Washington Redskins: Dutch Bergman was replaced by Dudley DeGroot.

Stadium changes
 The Boston Yanks began play at Fenway Park
 The merged Card-Pitt team split their games between Chicago's Comiskey Park and Pittsburgh's Forbes Field
 The Cleveland Rams resumed traditional operations at League Park
 The Philadelphia Eagles resumed traditional operations full time at Shibe Park

References

NFL Record and Fact Book
NFL History 1941–1950 (Last accessed December 4, 2005)
Total Football: The Official Encyclopedia of the National Football League

National Football League seasons